David Robert Clarke (born 1 January 1958) is a British former distance runner who competed over distances from the 1500 metres to the marathon. He represented Great Britain over 5000 metres at the 1983 World Championships in Athletics and the 1981 Summer Universiade.

He made twelve appearances at the IAAF World Cross Country Championships from 1977 to 1995. Individually, his performance came at the 1983 IAAF World Cross Country Championships, where he placed seventh overall. Clarke was a three-time silver medallist at the competition (1982, 1987, 1989) and also won a team bronze in 1992, sharing the honours with Mike McLeod, Hugh Jones, Julian Goater, Steve Kenyon, Karl Harrison, Carl Thackery, Kevin Forster, Steve Binns, Tim Hutchings, Gary Staines, Richard Nerurkar, and Eamonn Martin, among others.

Born in London, he attended Dulwich Prep London and then St Paul's School, London, where he took up running, as did his brothers Peter and Chris. Professionally, he worked as a labourer and hospital porter before becoming a history and physical education teacher.

He ranked in the top twenty in the world over 10,000 metres in the 1982 season. He shares the British record in the ekiden marathon relay, alongside Carl Thackery, Jon Solly, Mark Scrutton, and Karl Harrison, with a silver medal-winning time of 1:59:14 hours set at the 1986 IAAF World Challenge Road Relay.

In national competition he won the 5000 m title at the 1981 UK Athletics Championships, and was runner-up in that event at the 1983 AAA Championships. He won the English Cross Country Championships three times (1982, 1987, 1988) and won the British Cross Country Championships in 1992. He was also twice runner-up at the British race and a four-time runner-up at the English Championships. He won the British Universities Cross Country Championships in 1981. At sub-national level he won the 1984 title in the 3000 metres at the South of England Athletics Championships and the 5000 m inter-county race at the 1985 CAU Championships. On the professional circuit he won races including the 
Cross di Volpiano, Amatrice-Configno, Foulée Suresnoise, 1989 Stockholm Marathon and the Cross de Nantes.

He continues to take part in the sport as a masters athlete, mostly in local parkruns, though he completed the 2016 London Marathon in 3:03:54 hours.

International competitions

National titles
British Cross Country Championships
Long course: 1992
English Cross Country Championships
Long course: 1982, 1987, 1988
AAA Road Relay Championship: 1979 (leg 4)

Circuit wins
Cross di Volpiano: 1982, 1983
Amatrice-Configno: 1983
Foulée Suresnoise: 1987
Stockholm Marathon: 1989
Cross de Nantes: 1989, 1990

Personal bests
1500 metres – 3:39.27 (1982)
Mile run – 3:56.95 (1982)
3000 metres – 7:57.88 (1984)
5000 metres – 13:22.54 (1983)
10,000 metres – 27:55.77 (1982)
Marathon – 2:13:34 (1989)

References

External links

1958 births
Living people
Athletes from London
British male middle-distance runners
British male cross country runners
English male middle-distance runners
English male marathon runners
English male cross country runners
World Athletics Championships athletes for Great Britain
People educated at St Paul's School, London